The Priory Church of St Peter, Thurgarton is a former house of Canons Regular or "Black Canons" and now a Church of England church in Thurgarton Nottinghamshire.

They were called "Black Canons" because they wore Black Cassocks, Black Capes and Hoods.

History
It is thought that a priory was built at Thurgarton for its location in circa 1119. It was in a sheltered valley and had a stream and natural spring very near. It also had a good supply of wood and stone for building.

At the Dissolution of the Monasteries the Valor Ecclesiasticus gave the clear income of £259 9s. 4d., making it one of richer monasteries of the time.  King Henry VIII granted the manor partly to Trinity College, Cambridge, and partly to William Cooper. It was lived in by the Cooper family until at the end of the 17th century the estate passed to John Gilbert, who changed name to Cooper as a condition of William Cooper's will.

At the end of the 18th century the owner demolished the old priory, so that nothing of it was left but the cellars, and one aisle of the old church, plus the tower, which make up the present church. The original building would have rivalled nearby Southwell Minster, having two western towers and a nave of seven bays, cloister and a large chancel, plus the monastic houses.  The church was restored in 1853 by Thomas Chambers Hine. Parish registers exist from 1721; earlier records were lost in 1780.

The house that replaced the Priory was used as the Bishop of Southwell's palace whilst a new one was being built next to the Cathedral in Southwell.

List of the priors of Thurgarton
Thomas, occurs c. 1190
Henry, 1209; occurs 1218
William, occurs 1234-1245
Richard, occurs 1250-1257
Adam, occurs 1263-1276
Robert de Baseford, resigned 1284
Gilbert de Ponteburg, 1284–1290
Alexander de Gedling, 1290–1304
John de Ruddeston, 1304–1319
John de Hikeling, 1319–1331
Robert de Hathern, 1331–1337
John de Ruddeston, re-elected 1337-1338
Richard de Thurgarton, 1338–1345
Robert de Hickling, 1345–1349
Robert de Claxton, 1349
John de Calveton, died 1381
William de Saperton, 1381
Walter Hilton died 1396
Robert de Wolveden, occurs 1432; resigned 1434
Richard Haley, 1434
William Bingham, 1471–1477
Richard Thurgarton, died 1494
John Allestre, 1494
John Goverton, 1505
John Angear, 1517–1534
Thomas Dethick, 1534–1536
John Berwick, 1536

Parish status
It is in a joint parish with:
St Mary's Church, Bleasby
St James' Church, Halloughton
St Michael's Church, Hoveringham

See also
List of English abbeys, priories and friaries serving as parish churches

References

Thurgarton, St Peter
Thurgarton St Peter
Thurgarton
Newark and Sherwood
Thurgarton
1110s establishments in England
Christian monasteries established in the 12th century